John Coulter (12 February 1888, Belfast – 1 December 1980, Toronto) was an Irish Canadian playwright and broadcaster.

Life
He graduated from University of Manchester.  He taught school in Belfast and Dublin until 1919. 
He moved to London in 1920, where he wrote for BBC radio. In 1924 he became editor of The Ulster Review, and in 1927, managing editor of The New Adelphi.

He moved to Toronto in 1936, where he wrote for CBC radio, and he married Olive Clare Primrose, a poet and short story writer. They had two daughters.

His papers are held at McMaster University.

Works

Autobiography
 In My Day: Memoirs, Willowdale, ON: Hounslow Press, 1980

Novels
 Turf Smoke, Ryerson Press, 1945

Biography
 Churchill, Ryerson Press, 1944

Plays
 Conochar, Broadcast BBC, 1934
 The Folks In Brickfield Street, Abbey Theatre, Dublin 1937
 The House In The Quiet Glen, Margaret Eaton Hall, Toronto, 1937 (Awarded Best Canadian Play at the Dominion Drama Festival, 1938.)
 Holy Manhattan, Arts and Letters Club, Toronto, 1940
 Pigs, Hart House Theatre, 1940
 Christmas Comes But Once A Year, Arts and Letters Club, Toronto 1942
 Transit Through Fire, University of Toronto at Convocation Hall, 1942
 Mr Oblomoff, 1946
 The Drums Are Out, Abbey Theatre, Dublin  1948
 Riel, New Play Society, Toronto, 1950
 Sleep My Pretty One, rehearsed reading St James Theatre, London, 1951
 Dierdre, Macmillan Theatre, Toronto, 1965
 The Crime Of Louis Riel, Dominion Drama Festival, London, Ontario 1966
 The Trial Of Louis Riel, Saskatchewan House, Regina, 1967
 Riel: a play: in two parts, Cromlech Press, 1972
 A Capful Of Pennies, Central Library Theatre, Toronto 1967
 The drums are out: a play in three acts, De Paul University, 1971
 While I Live, 1971
 Francois Bigot: A Rediscovery in Dramatic Form of the Fall of Quebec, Hounslow Press, Toronto, 1978
 Living Together, Theatre Passe Muraille, Toronto  1980
 Mr Kean Of Drury Lane, 1980

Opera librettas
 Transit Through Venus, 1942
 Deirdre of the Sorrows, 1946

References

External links
"John Coulter", Literary Encyclopedia
"John Coulter", doollee
John Coulter entry in The Canadian Encyclopedia
 

Writers from Belfast
1888 births
1980 deaths
20th-century Canadian dramatists and playwrights
Alumni of the University of Manchester
Canadian male dramatists and playwrights
20th-century Canadian male writers
Northern Ireland emigrants to Canada